The Legislative Assembly of Vologda Oblast is the regional parliament of Vologda Oblast, a federal subject of Russia. A total of 34 deputies are elected for five-year terms.

Elections

2016

2021

References

Vologda Oblast
Politics of Vologda Oblast